A diplomatic flag is a flag used by a sovereign state engaging in diplomacy which is different from the nation's normal national flag. Some nations also have personal flags that are used by their diplomatic representatives, such as the U.S. Foreign Service flags.

National Diplomatic Flag
Currently, only two nations use diplomatic flags: Thailand (formerly Siam) and the United Kingdom. Different flags are used based upon the diplomatic rank of the mission. British High Commissions do not use diplomatic flags but rather the normal flag of the United Kingdom, since members of the Commonwealth are not considered 'foreign' by the government of the United Kingdom.

Thailand

United Kingdom

Historical National Diplomatic Flags

Siam

Sweden and Norway
The members of the union between Sweden and Norway each had their own separate national flags, however they also had a flag named the Union mark, which was used as the flag of the common diplomatic representations of both countries abroad.

Personal Diplomatic and Consular Flags

United Kingdom

United States

Historical Personal Diplomatic Flags

United Kingdom

Yugoslavia
The flag for the accredited representatives of the state (diplomats and heads of consular missions) of the Socialist Federal Republic of Yugoslavia was similar to the civil ensign, that is the national flag in 2:3 ratio.

References

Diplomacy
Types of flags